Seaview Knights is a 1994 British comedy film directed by Richard Kurti and starring James Bolam, Sarah Alexander and Clive Darby.

Premise
King Arthur and the knights of the round table wake up to find themselves in modern Blackpool.

Cast
 Sarah Alexander ...  Jackie
 James Bolam ...  Merlin
 Abigail Canton ...  Whiplash
 Clive Darby ...  Arthur
 Anita Dobson ...  The Blind Concierge
 Hildegarde Neil ...  The Psychiatrist
 Gary Tippings ... Lancelot

References

External links

1994 films
1994 comedy films
British comedy films
Arthurian films
1990s English-language films
1990s British films